Rock View is an unincorporated community in Wyoming County, West Virginia, United States.

The community takes its name from a nearby rock formation, Castle Rock.

Climate
The climate in this area is characterized by hot, humid summers and generally mild to cool winters.  According to the Köppen Climate Classification system, Rock View has a humid subtropical climate, abbreviated "Cfa" on climate maps.

References

Unincorporated communities in West Virginia
Unincorporated communities in Wyoming County, West Virginia